Tom Danks (30 May 1863 – 27 April 1908) was an English international footballer, who played as an inside right.

Career
Born in Nottingham, Tom Danks played for Nottingham Forest, and earned one cap for England in 1885.

References

External links

1863 births
1908 deaths
English footballers
England international footballers
Nottingham Forest F.C. players
English Football League players
Association football forwards